The 4th Dragoon Regiment was a cavalry unit created during the Ancien Regime and was dissolved on July 11, 2014.

Creation and different names 
 1667 : creation of the 4e Régiment de dragons under the designation of Beaupré-Cavalry
 1684 : Chartres-Cavalry
 1724 : Clermont-Prince-Cavalry
 1771 : Marche-Prince-Cavalry
 1776 : Conti-Dragons
 1791 : 4e Régiment de dragons
 1814 : 2e Régiment de dragons de la Reine
 1815 : 4e Régiment de dragons
 1815 : dissolution of the regiment
 1816 : creation under the designation of Régiment des dragons de la Gironde
 1825 : 4e Régiment de dragons
 1926 : dissolution of the regiment 
 1929 : creation of the regiment under the designation of 4e bataillon de dragons portés from the 4e groupe de chasseurs cyclistes
 1935 : 4e Régiment de dragons portés
 1940 : dissolution of the regiment
 1947 : creation of the regiment under the designation of 4e bataillon de dragons portés
 1948 : 4e Régiment de dragons portés
 1950 : 4e Régiment de dragons
 1954 : dissolution of the regiment
 1955 : creation of 4e Régiment de dragons
 1962 : dissolution of the regiment
 1968 : creation of 4e Régiment de dragons
 1990 : squadrons group of 4e Régiment de dragons
 1994 : dissolution of the regiment 
 July 27, 2009 : recreation of 4e Régiment de dragons by designation change nomination of the 1er-11e Régiment de cuirassiers.
 July 11, 2014 : dissolution.

History

Ancien Regime 
The unit took part in all campaigns of the Ancien Regime:

 Guerre de Hollande (1672–1678)
 Guerre de la Ligue d'Augsbourg (1689–1697)
 War of the Spanish Succession (1701–1713)
 War of the Quadruple Alliance (1719)
 War of the Polish Succession (1733–1736)
 War of the Austrian Succession(1740–1748)
 Seven Years' War (1756–1763)

Wars of the Revolution & Empire

1815 to 1848 

The unit was designated as the 2e Régiment des dragons de la Reine under the first restoration, then readopted the old designation during the 100 days; following the abdication of Napoleon Ier, the unit was designated as dragons de la Gironde, then retook the number designation 4 in 1825.

Second Empire 

The regiment led life in the garrison without any history.

1871 to 1914 
In 1870, the regiment participated to combats of the Armée de la Loire. 
During the Paris Commune in 1871, the regiment participated with the Armée Versaillaise.

World War I

The regiment joined in 1913 the 12e brigade de dragons at Commercy and Sézanne  (2e division de cavalerie from August 1914 to November 1918). The 2nd Cavalry Division is attached to the cavalry corps of général Conneau until September 1, 1914.

 In 1914, the regiment covered the 1er and 2e armées from August 4 to 15 1914. At La Mortagne on August 25, two squadrons hold the wooden forest of de Lalau alongside the chasseur à pied. Under the orders of colonel Dolfus, the regiment apprehended the villages of Chazelles and Gondrexon on November 2, and ten days later, those of Saint-Sauveur and Val-et-Châtillon. After the battle of the Marne, the regiment joined the trenches.
 In 1915, the regiment led combats on Lorraine. 
 In 1916 in Alsace until June, then in the valley of La Somme east to Amiens, ready to exploit by horse a successful anticipation. Following the failure of the offensive, the regiment was back in the trenches. 
 From November 1916 to January 1917, the regiment joined the trenches of Soissons. At the beginning of the month of March, the regiment is the camp of Mailly. On April 17, the regiment assisted to the Second Battle of the Aisne without taking part in the battle. The regiment joined the sector of Ludes, east of Reims until January 1918. In the meantime, in June and September, the regiment was in the outskirts of Paris to fend off any internal complications. In February 1918, the regiment was summoned for the same reasons at Valence, then Saint-Étienne. 
 Following the German spring offensive end of Mars on Amiens, the regiment let combats in the Flandres at mont des Cats. The regiment was successful at Locre from April 26 to 29 1918, enduring the loss of 80% of effectifs and being cited at the orders of the armed forces. Following a forced march of 200 km, the regiment led combats on Ourcq and apprehended Montmarlet and Montemafroy. The regiment was seen attributed a second citation at the orders of the armed forces, and the fourragere with colors of the croix de guerre 1914–1918.

Interwar period 
From 1918 to 1923, the regiment garrisoned at Castres, then Carcasonne where a dissolution was placed in effect in 1926. Recreated in 1929 under the designation of 4e bataillon de dragons portés 4e BDP, the regiment was formed at Trèves from elements of the 4e groupe de chasseurs cyclistes. The regiment was equipped with chenilettes Citroën, automatic machine guns AMR and side-cars. In 1935, the regiment was designated as 4e régiment de dragons portés and garrisoned at Verdun.

World War II 

On May 10, 1940, the regiment, with the rest of the 1st Light Mechanized Division, made way to Holland, region of Tilburg. On May 12 and 13 and following intense combats, the regiment took a hard turn on the south of the Albert canal, then made way to France. The regiment was engaged in combat during the entire Battle of France. The regiment was dissolved on July 8, 1940 and was cited at the orders of the armed forces for conduit during the short campaign duration.

1945 to 1994 
Recreated in February 1947 under the designation of 4e bataillon de dragons portés, the battalion was sent to Tonkin on March 25 of the same year. The battalion was sent to Cochinchine in 1948, on November 1, the battalion was redesignated as 4e régiment de dragons portés.  The regiment became 4e Régiment de dragons on February 16, 1950. On June 30, 1954, the regiment was dissolved after a 7-year presence in Indochina.  The regiment was cited twice at the orders of the armed corps. The 4e Régiment de dragons was formed from elements of the 5th Armoured Division 5e DB on November 15, 1955, in West Germany, then was sent to Algeria on June 19. On April 28, 1968, at Olivet, the regiment was recreated and equipped with AMX-13 tanks, composed of two squadrons and two companies of VTT. On June 30, 1979, the regiment was dissolved.  The regiment was recreated on September 1, 1979, at Mourmelon-le-Grand. The regiment was accordingly equipped with 54 AMX 30 B2. The first squadron of the regiment was professionalized and participated in Tchad to Operation Manta from January to June 1984. The regiment was entirely professionalized in 1990. the 4e dragons was the (heavy AMX-30 B2) armoured tank cavalry regiment of Division Daguet during the first Gulf War. The regiment participated to the principal mission of the division in liaison with the 3rd Marine Infantry Regiment 3e RIMa. The regiment was cited at the orders of the armed forces and was awarded the croix de guerre des théâtres d’opérations extérieurs with palm. The regiment participated in September 1992 within the United Nations cadres force FORPRONU. Strong with two units, the regiment participated to readying an infantry battalion acting in Croatia. Dissolved in 1994, on June 28, 2006, the honor guard was entrusted to the combat training center at Mailly.

2009 to 2014 

The 4e Régiment de dragons was reactivated in 2009 by dissolution of the 1er-11e Régiment de cuirassiers de Carpiagne and equipped with Leclerc tanks. A part of the regiment was deployed to Lebanon at the corps of the United Nations Interim Force in Lebanon.

The regiment formed the composition of 7th Armoured Brigade. The 4e RD, recreated on August 1, 2009, succeeded to the 1er-11e Régiment de cuirassiers de Carpiagne. The regiment was restructured in the summer of 2009 passing by an organization bi-bataillonnaire to a structure of 4 tank squadrons supported by a rear defensive base. Announced in the 2013 restructurations, the regiment was dissolved on July 11, 2014.

Subordinations 

The regiment is subordinated to the 7th Armoured Brigade, a part component of terrestrial forces.

Compositions 
 four Leclerc squadrons
 one logistics & command squadron
 one reserve squadron

Missions 

In 2009, 70% of the regiment was deployed to Lebanon, Kosovo, Senegal and Afghanistan.

The plan Vigipirate constituted equally an important mission part for the regiment, assured all year long in Paris and in regions around France.

Traditions & uniforms 

The uniformed royal ordinance of 1786 fixed the uniforms of the Régiments de dragons. The uniform background is dark green (vert dragon). The uniforms are of a distinct color attributed to each regiment.

Regimental Colors

Decorations 

The regimental colors of the 4e Régiment de dragons is decorated with:

 Croix de guerre 1914–1918 with: 
 2 palms
 Croix de guerre 1939-1945 with :
 1 palm
 Croix de guerre des théâtres d'opérations extérieures with: 
 2 vermeil stars (for service in Indochina)
  Croix de guerre des théâtres d'opérations extérieures with :
 1 palm 
  croix de la vaillance vietnamienne:
 with 1 vermeil star

Fourragere:
 The regiment bears wearing the fourragere with colors of the croix de guerre 1914–1918.

Honours

Battle Honours 

Valmy 1792
Eylau 1807
Badajoz 1811
Nangis 1814
La Mortagne 1914
L'Avre 1918
Flandres 1918
L'Aisne 1918
Indochine 1947–1954
AFN 1952-19623
Koweït 1990–1991

Regimental Commanders

Notable Officers & dragons 
 général Maxime Weygand (1888), then a lieutenant.

References

Sources et bibliographies 
 Musée des Blindés ou Association des amis du musée des Blindés 1043, route de Fontevraud, 49400 Saumur
 France militaire by Abel Hugo, 1838

Dragoon regiments of France
1667 establishments in France
2014 disestablishments in France
Military units and formations established in 1667
Military units and formations disestablished in 2014